Colegio Marista Pio XII (Marist College Pius XII) was founded in 1961 in Ponta Grossa, Brazil, by the Marist Brothers. It covers early childhood through secondary education, and emphasizes learning English throughout the years.

References

Marist Brothers schools 
Catholic primary schools in Brazil
Educational institutions established in 1961
Catholic secondary schools in Brazil
1961 establishments in Brazil